Oscar Joseph Taelman (5 October 1877 – 23 October 1945) was a rower who competed in the 1908 Summer Olympics for Belgium. He competed as part of the Royal Club Nautique de Gand which won the silver medal in the coxed eight.

References

1877 births
1945 deaths
Belgian male rowers
Olympic rowers of Belgium
Olympic silver medalists for Belgium
Rowers at the 1908 Summer Olympics
Olympic medalists in rowing
Medalists at the 1908 Summer Olympics
European Rowing Championships medalists
20th-century Belgian people